Republica is a metro station in Bucharest, servicing the heavy machinery plant with the same name and the Cora hypermarket located in the vicinity. Also, the Titan Sud train station is located in the immediate vicinity.

It is also the terminus for most trains of  M1, as between Republica and Pantelimon metro station, the only service provided is a train every 20 minutes.

The station was opened on 28 December 1981 as the eastern terminus of the second phase of Line 1 between Timpuri Noi and Republica. In 1991, Pantelimon station opened next to the existing rail yard, and the line was extended.

References

Bucharest Metro stations
Railway stations opened in 1981
1981 establishments in Romania